Kessleria copidota is a moth of the family Yponomeutidae. It is endemic to New Zealand.

References

Moths described in 1889
Yponomeutidae
Taxa named by Edward Meyrick
Moths of New Zealand
Endemic fauna of New Zealand
Endemic moths of New Zealand